St. John Berchmans Church or St. Jan Berchmans Church may refer to:

 St. Jan Berchmans Church, Brussels, in Etterbeek, Brussels, Belgium
 Saint-Jean-Berchmans Church, in Montreal, Canada
 Immacolata al Tiburtino or Santa Maria Immacolata e San Giovanni Berchmans, Rome, Italy
Cathedral of St. John Berchmans (Shreveport, Louisiana), United States
St. John Berchmans Parish church, Logan Square, Chicago, Illinois, United States

See also
 John Berchmans
 St John Berchmans College
 St John Berchmans University College, Heverlee